National Route 476 is a national highway of Japan. The highway connects Ōno, Fukui and Tsuruga, Fukui.

See also

References

476
Roads in Fukui Prefecture